Anceya terebriformis is a species of tropical freshwater snail with an operculum, aquatic gastropod mollusk in the family Paludomidae.

This species is found in Lake Tanganyika in the Democratic Republic of the Congo and Tanzania. The only known threat may be sedimentation from deforestation in Tanzania.

Anceya terebriformis has been considered as Endangered species in 1996.

References

Paludomidae
Gastropods described in 1890
Taxonomy articles created by Polbot